The Diocese of Cochin is a Latin Church ecclesiastical jurisdiction or diocese of the Catholic Church in the city of Cochin, India. It is a suffragan in the ecclesiastical province of the metropolitan Archdiocese of Verapoly. The diocese serves Latin Catholics of Malabar.

The territory of the Diocese of Cochin covers 235 square kilometers in the state of Kerala. It is situated between the Arabian Sea in the west, the Archdiocese of Verapoly in the north and in the east, and the Diocese of Alleppey in the south.

The diocese's cathedral church and cathedral of the Bishop of Cochin is Santa Cruz Basilica, Fort Cochin. The current bishop is Joseph Kariyil, appointed by Pope Benedict XVI on 8 May 2009.

Historical summary
The Diocese of Cochin, now diminutive in size due to successive bifurcations in the course of time, once used to be the mother diocese of many a bishopric in the Sub-continent. The erstwhile mother diocese extended in the west coast from Malabar, down south to Cape Comorin (the present Kanya Kumari and still further down, Ceylon ( now, Sri Lanka ) and stretched along the east coast all the way up, encompassing Nepal, Bangladesh and beyond Burma ( now, Myanmar ) and still further east to Hong Kong, Malacca and Macau.

Brief history
The history of the Diocese of Cochin begins with the arrival of the Portuguese Missionaries in India. These neo-apostles reached Kappad near Kozhikode on 20 May 1498, along with Vasco Da Gama.

A second expedition under Captain Álvares Cabral, comprising 13 ships and 18 priests, anchored at Cochin on 26 Nov. 1500. Cabral soon won the goodwill of the Raja of Cochin. He allowed four priests to do apostolic work among the early Christian communities, St. Thomas Christians scattered in and around Cochin. Thus Portuguese missionaries established a Portuguese Mission in 1500.

During the reign of the Catholic emperor of Portugal John III, more Franciscan friars and priests reached Goa. Along with them a highly trained team of Jesuit missionaries led by Father Francis Xavier reached Cochin. Later, he requested the help of Jesuit General St. Ignatius and the emperor for more missionaries from Portugal. Francis Xavier visited Cochin several times and stayed more than 120 days. He used to offer mass at St. Antony's Church. This church is still at Cochin, known as Lenthapally (Dutch church). At present this church is under the department of the Archaeological Survey of India as an historical monument.

Jesuits, Dominicans, Augustinians and Carmelites followed them. At the arrival of the Portuguese, local converts in Cochin area joined the Roman Latin rite thus the Latin Community was formed.

A monastery of the Franciscans, "Santo Antonino", was established in Cochin in 1518 and two others of the Jesuits in 1550 and 1561. In 1553 the Dominicans founded their college and monastery in Cochin.

The whole of the east was under the jurisdiction of the diocese of Lisbon. On 12 June 1514, Cochin and Goa became two prominent mission stations under the newly created Funchal diocese in Madeira. Pope Paul III by the Bull Quequem Reputamus raised Funchal as an archdiocese and Goa as its suffragan, deputing the whole of India under the diocese of Goa.

When the diocese of Goa was established in 1534, Cochin became part of the new diocese.

The diocese of Cochin was established by the papal bull pro excellenti praeeminentia issued by Pope Paul IV on 4 February 1558 as one of two new suffragan dioceses (the other being Diocese of Malacca) to the Archdiocese of Goa. The Pope also declared the Portuguese Church of Santa Cruz as the Cathedral of the new diocese. At that time, Cochin was the second diocese in India and had the jurisdiction over the whole of South, East India, Burma and Ceylon.

The first bishop of Cochin was a Dominican priest Dom George Temudo (1557-1567).

In 1663 the Dutch conquered Cochin and destroyed all the catholic churches and institutions except the Cathedral and the church of St. Francis Assisi. During the British conquest of Cochin, the cathedral was destroyed.

The diocese of Cochin stood witness to many important historical events including the Synod of Diamper which was held on 10 June 1599 in the East Syrian Archdiocese of Angamaly and India, conducted by the Archbishop, Alexis De Menezes of Goa.

Since 1646, the administration of the diocese was difficult. It was often affected by the conquests of Cochin by the Dutch. Bishops who were consecrated as the bishops of the diocese could not reach here. As a result, fractions, rebellions and schisms erupted in the diocese. In order to bring the dissidents back to the mother church, Holy See sent Carmelite Missionaries. Thus was established the Vicariate of Malabar in 1657. In 1709 it was changed into the Vicariate of Verapoly. In 1838 the diocese of Cochin was annexed to the Vicariate of Verapoly. From 1838 and 1886, the diocese of Cochin was governed by the Vicar Apostolic of Verapoly.

On 23 June 1886, Pope Leo XIII promulgated the famous Concordat called Humane Salutis Auctor by which the Diocese of Cochin was restored to its original condition and placed again as a suffragan under the Diocese of Goa. Simultaneously, the Vicariate of Verapoly was raised to archdiocese and the Diocese of Quilon was erected as its suffragan.

After the reorganization in 1886, five Portuguese bishops ruled the diocese. In 1950 the diocese was handed over to the native clergy. Dr. Alexander Edezhath (1951-1975) was the first Indian bishop. He was succeeded by Bishop Joseph Kureethara (1975-1999). After his demise, in 2000 Bishop John Thattumkal was appointed as the bishop of the diocese and he was suspended from his responsibilities over a scandal. Bishop Joseph Kariyil was appointed as the new bishop of Cochin on 8 May 2009 and was installed as the bishop of Cochin on 5 July 2009

Ordinaries

Jorge Temudo, O.P. (4 Feb 1558 – 13 Jan 1567), appointed Archbishop of Goa
Henrique de Távora e Brito, O.P. (13 Jan 1567 – 29 Jan 1577), appointed Archbishop of Goa
Mateus de Medina, O. Carm. (29 Jan 1577 – 19 Feb 1588), appointed Archbishop of Goa
Andrés de Santa Maria, O.F.M. (1588 - 1615), Resigned
Sebastião de São Pedro, O.S.A. (16 Feb 1615 – 7 Oct 1624), appointed Archbishop of Goa
Luis de Brito de Menezes, O.S.A. (27 May 1627 – 29 Jul 1629), Died
Miguel Da Cruz Rangel, O.P. (10 Nov 1631 – 14 Sep 1646), Died
Pedro da Silva, O.S.A. (8 Jan 1689 – 15 Mar 1691) Died
Pedro Pacheco, O.P. (4 Jan 1694 - Sep 1714) Died
Francisco de Vasconcellos, S.J. (12 Feb 1721 – 30 Mar 1743) Died
Clemente José Colaço Leitão, S.J. (8 Mar 1745 – 31 Jan 1771) Died :de:Clemens Joseph Colaco Leitao
Emmanuel Felix Soares (de Santa Catarina), O.C.D. (20 Jul 1778 – 18 Jul 1783), appointed Archbishop of Goa
Josephus Marques da Silva, O.C.D. (18 Jul 1783 - )
Tomas Manoel de Noronha e Brito, O.P. (17 Dec 1819 – 23 Jun 1828), appointed Bishop of Olinda
João Gomes Ferreira (14 Mar 1887 – 4 May 1897) Died
Matheus de Oliveira Xavier (11 Oct 1897 – 26 Feb 1909), appointed Archbishop of Goa
José Bento Martins Ribeiro (28 Feb 1909 – 21 May 1931) Died
Abílio Augusto Vaz das Neves (4 Dec 1933 – 8 Dec 1938), appointed Bishop of Bragança e Miranda
José Vieira Alvernaz (13 Aug 1941 – 23 Dec 1950), appointed Coadjutor Archbishop of Goa e Damão
Alexander Edezhath (19 Jun 1952 – 29 Aug 1975) Resigned
Joseph Kureethara (29 Aug 1975 – 6 Jan 1999) Died
John Thattumkal, S.S.C. (10 May 2000 – 8 May 2009) Resigned
Joseph Kariyil (8 May 2009 - )

Churches

Among the fifty parish churches, six district churches namely, Santa Cruz Basilica Cathedral, St Antony's Forane Church Kannamaly, St Sebastian's Church Thoppumpady, Sacred Heart Church Kumbalanghi, St Augustines Church Aroor and St Mary's Forane Church Thankey serve as Forane Churches.

Pilgrim Centres Of The Diocese
1, Santa Cruz Cathedral Basilica Fortcochin
2, Our Lady Of Hope Church Vypeen
3, Our Lady Of Life Church - Holy Cross Shrine Mattancherry
4,St Antony's Shrine Chullikal
5, Our Lady Of Good Health Church Maruvakad, Chellanam
6,St Antony's Forane Church Kannamaly, St Joseph's Miraculous Shrine Kannamaly
7, St Jude Thadeus Church Judanagar Kattiparmbu
8, St Louis Church Mundamvely
9, St Lawrence Church Edacochin
10, Santa Cruz Church Perumpadappu
11, St George Church Pazangad
12, St Augustine Church Aroor
13,St Antony's Church Arookutty
14, Our Lady Of Assumption Church Poomkavu
15, St Mary's Forane Church Thankey 

1st District
Santa Cruz Cathedral Basilica,(Estd.1505), Fortcochin
Our Lady Of Hope Church (Estd. 1605), Vypeen
Our Lady of Life Church, (Estd.9th Century), Mattancherry
SS. Peter & Paul, (Estd. 1857), Amaravathy, Fortkochi
Holy Family Church, (Estd. 1901), Nazreth
St. Joseph's Bethlehem Church, (Estd. 1974), Chullickal
Stella Maris Church, (Estd. 1955), Willington Island
St. Mary's Church,(Estd) Kochery

2nd District
St. Thomas The Apostle Church, ( Estd. 1990), Santhome
St. Louis Church, (Estd.9th Century), Mundamveli
  St. Francis Assisi Church ( Estd. 1980), Kaattipparambu
St. Joseph'S Church, ( Estd. 1968), Cheriyakadavu
St. Antony's Church, ( Estd. 1873), Kannamaaly
St. Sebastian'S Church, ( Estd. 1832), Chellanam
St.John The Baptist Church Anjilathara, 

3rd District
St. Sebastian's Church, (Estd. 1833), Thoppumpady
St. Joseph's Church, ( Estd. 1965), Chirackal 
St. Lawrence Church, (Estd. 1986), Palluruthy
St. Thomas More Church, ( Estd. 1991), Palluruthy
Santa Cruz Church, ( Estd. 1965), Perumpadappu
St. Mary's Church, (Estd. 1978), Edakochi
St. Lawrence Church, (Estd.9th Century), Edakochi
St.Joseph's Church Maduracompany, Palluruthy
Santa Maria Church Perumpadappu.

4th District
St. Joseph's Church, ( Estd. 1967), Kumbalangy North
Martin D' Pores Church, (Estd. 1996), Kallencherry
Sacred Heart Church, (Estd. 1994), Kumbalangy
St. Peter's Church, (Estd. 1875), Kumbalangy
St. George's Church, (Estd. 1869), Pazhangaad, Kumbalangy South
Immaculate Conception Church, (Estd. 1977), Ezhupunna
St. Sebastian's Church, (Estd. 1977), Neendakara
Holy Maries Church Azhikakam
San Jos Church Kumbalanghi

5th District
St. Augustine's Church, (Estd. 1901), Aroor
St. Joseph's Church, (Estd. 1977), Kumbalam
St. Antony's Church, (Estd. 1978), Arookutty
St. Francis Xavier's Church, (Estd. 1843), Eramallore
St. Joseph's Church, ( Estd. 1986), Vallethode
Our Lady of Fatima Church, Kodamthuruth
Our Lady of Ransom Church, (Estd. 2004), Chandiroor
Little Flower Church Perumbalam
St Sebastian's Church Kaarunyapuram

6th District
St. George Church, (Estd. 2017), Arasupuram 
St. Antony's Church (Estd. 2015), Pathirapally
St. Sebastian's Church, ( Estd. 2016), Areeparambu
Our Lady of Assumption Church, (Estd. 1860), Poomkavu
St. Francis Xavier's Church, (Estd. 1936), Vayalar
St. George Church, (Estd. 1866), Arthumkal
St. Mary's Church, (Estd. 1832), Thankey

In 9th century there were only 3 parishes in West Kochi They are 1) St.Lawrence Church Edakochi, 2) Our Lady Of Life Church Mattancherry, 3) St.Louis Church Mundamveli

Saints and causes for canonisation
 Servant of God Lawrence Puliyanath

Institutions 
Seminaries

 Mount Carmel Petit Seminary Fortcochin (Estd 1960)
Holy Cross Study House Alwaye (Estd 2001)

Colleges
Aquinas College Edacochin
Avila College Of Teacher Education Edacochin
Siena College Of Professional Studies Edacochin
Aquinas Institute Of Management (AIM) Fortcochin
St Joseph's College , Thoppumpady
Jubilee Memorial Private ITI Fortcochin Veli

Schools
Santa Cruz Public School Eramallore
St Paul's Public School Fortcochin
St John De Brittos Anglo Indian Boys High School Fortcochin

Hospitals
Fatima Hospital and Research Centre Perumpadappu
CULTES Perumpadappu

Pastoral Service Centres
Alpha Pastoral Centre Edacochin
Catholic Centre Thoppumpady
Cochin Social Service Society Fortcochin Veli

Press
Cochin Institute Of Printing Technology (CIPT) Thoppumpady

Notes

External links
 Diocesan directory | www.ucanews.com
 GCatholic 
 Catholic Hierarchy 
  Diocese website 

Roman Catholic dioceses in India
Dioceses in Kerala
Religious organizations established in the 1550s
1558 establishments in India
Roman Catholic dioceses established in the 16th century
Churches in Ernakulam district